Roland Pembroke Hanna (February 10, 1932 – November 13, 2002) was an American jazz pianist, composer, and teacher.

Biography
Hanna studied classical piano from the age of 11, but was strongly interested in jazz, having been introduced to it by his friend, pianist Tommy Flanagan. This interest increased after his time in military service (1950–1952). He studied briefly at the Eastman School of Music in 1953 and then enrolled at the Juilliard School when he moved to New York City two years later. He worked with several big names in the 1950s, including Benny Goodman and Charles Mingus, and graduated in 1960. Between 1963 and 1966, Hanna led his own trio, then from 1966 to 1974 he was a regular member of The Thad Jones/Mel Lewis Orchestra. Hanna also toured the Soviet Union with the orchestra in 1972. During the 1970s, he was a member of the New York Jazz Quartet.

Roland Hanna was in semi-retirement for most of the 1980s, though he played piano and wrote the song "Seasons" for Sarah Vaughan's 1982 album Crazy and Mixed Up, and returned to music later in the decade. In the late 1980s and early 1990s, Hanna was a member of the Lincoln Center Jazz Orchestra and the Smithsonian Jazz Masterworks Orchestra. Around this time, he also began composing chamber and orchestral music; a ballet he wrote has also been performed.

In 1970, Hanna was given an honorary knighthood by President William Tubman of Liberia in recognition of concerts he played in the country to raise money for education. Thereafter, Hanna was often known as "Sir Roland Hanna." Hanna was a professor of jazz at the Aaron Copland School of Music at Queens College (CUNY) in Flushing, New York, and taught at several other music schools. He was a resident of Teaneck, New Jersey.

He died in Hackensack, New Jersey, of a viral infection of the heart, on November 13, 2002.

Discography

As leader/co-leader 

Posthumous compilations
 Memoir One For Eiji with Eiji Nakayama (What's New, 2004)
 Colors from a Giant's Kit (IPO, 2011)

As group 
The New York Jazz Quartet
In Concert in Japan with Ron Carter, Ben Riley, Frank Wess (Salvation, 1975) – live
Surge with George Mraz, Richard Pratt, Frank Wess, (Enja, 1977)
Song of the Black Knight with George Mraz, Richard Pratt, Frank Wess (Sonet, 1978)
Blues for Sarka with George Mraz, Grady Tate, Frank Wess (Enja, 1978) – live
Oasis with George Mraz, Ben Riley, Frank Wess (Enja, 1981)
The New York Jazz Quartet in Chicago with George Mraz, Ben Riley, Frank Wess (Bee Hive, 1981)

Mingus Dynasty
 Live At Montreux (Atlantic, 1981) – live
 Reincarnation (Soul Note, 1982)
 Mingus' Sounds Of Love (Soul Note, 1988)
 Live At The Village Vanguard (Storyville, 1989) – live
 Epitaph (Charles Mingus composition)  (Columbia, 1990) – live recorded in 1989

 As sideman With Pepper Adams Ephemera (Spotlite, 1974) – recorded in 1973
 Reflectory (Muse, 1978)With Kenny Burrell Swingin' (Blue Note, 1980) – recorded in 1956
 On View at the Five Spot Cafe (Blue Note, 1959) – live
 Asphalt Canyon Suite (Verve, 1969)
 Ellington Is Forever Volume Two (Fantasy, 1977) – recorded in 1975With Ron Carter All Blues (CTI, 1973)
 Spanish Blue (CTI, 1974)
 Stardust (Somethin' Else, 2001)With Richard Davis Muses for Richard Davis (MPS, 1969)
 Persia My Dear (DIW, 1987)With Elvin Jones Dear John C. (Impulse!, 1965)
 Very R.A.R.E. (Trio (Japan), 1979)With Jimmy Knepper Cunningbird (SteepleChase, 1977)
 I Dream Too Much (Soul Note, 1984)With Red Rodney The Red Tornado (Muse, 1975)
 Red, White and Blues (Muse, 1978)
 The 3R's (Muse, 1982) – recorded in 1979With Sonny Stitt Mr. Bojangles (Cadet, 1973)
 Satan (Cadet, 1974)With others' Gene Ammons, My Way (Prestige, 1971)
 George Benson, Good King Bad (CTI, 1975)
 Dee Dee Bridgewater, Afro Blue (Trio, 1974)
 Ruth Brown, Ruth Brown '65 (Mainstream, 1965)
 Benny Carter, In the Mood for Swing (MusicMasters, 1988)
 Eddie "Lockjaw" Davis, Love Calls (RCA Victor, 1968)
 Eddie Daniels, First Prize! (Prestige 1967)
 Jon Faddis and Billy Harper, Jon & Billy (Trio, 1974)
 Stéphane Grappelli, Meets the Rhythm Section (1973)
 John Handy, In the Vernacular (Roulette, 1958)
 Jimmy Heath, Little Man Big Band (Verve, 1992)
 Al Hibbler, Early One Morning (LMI, 1964)
 Freddie Hubbard, The Hub of Hubbard (MPS, 1970)
 Jim Hall, Concierto (CTI,1975)
 Miriam Klein, By Myself (L+R, 1979)
 Hubert Laws, Laws' Cause (Atlantic, 1968)
 Lincoln Center Jazz Orchestra, Lincoln Center Jazz Orchestra – Jazz At Lincoln Center: They Came To Swing (Sony, 1992)
 Herbie Mann, Glory of Love (A&M, 1967)
 Les McCann, Comment (Atlantic, 1970)
 Charles Mingus, Mingus Dynasty (Columbia, 1959)
 Frank Morgan, You Must Believe in Spring (Antilles, 1992)
 Idris Muhammad, House of the Rising Sun (Kudu, 1976)
 Ray Nance, Body and Soul (Solid State, 1969)
 Kwame Nkrumah, The Ninth Son (Columbia, 1969)
 Seldon Powell, Seldon Powell Sextet Featuring Jimmy Cleveland (Roost 1956)
 Don Sebesky, The Rape of El Morro (CTI, 1975)
 Louis Smith (musician), Prancin (Steeple Chase 1979)
 Stanley Turrentine,If I Could (MusicMasters, 1993)
 Phil Woods,Round Trip'' (Verve, 1969)

References

External links

rahannamusic.com
Sir Roland Hanna at allaboutjazz.com

American jazz pianists
American male pianists
Cool jazz pianists
Hard bop pianists
Mainstream jazz pianists
Post-bop pianists
1932 births
2002 deaths
 
Jazz musicians from New Jersey
Jazz musicians from New York (state)
Musicians from Detroit
People from Teaneck, New Jersey
Freedom Records artists
Enja Records artists
MPS Records artists
Venus Records artists
20th-century American pianists
Jazz musicians from Michigan
20th-century American male musicians
American male jazz musicians
Mingus Dynasty (band) members
The Thad Jones/Mel Lewis Orchestra members
Black & Blue Records artists
Black Lion Records artists
CTI Records artists
Atco Records artists